Surya IPS is a 1991 Telugu-language action crime film produced by T. Subbarami Reddy under the Maheswari Parameswari Productions banner and directed by A. Kodandarami Reddy. Venkatesh and Vijayashanti played the lead roles, and the music was composed by Ilaiyaraaja. The film was recorded as Average at the box office. It was later dubbed in Tamil as Mudhalamaichar Jayanthi.

Plot
Surya (Venkatesh) is a carefree, irreponsible young man. His grandfather (Satyanarayana) forces him to join the police force. Sirisha (Vijayashanti), Surya's college mate is also selected as a police cadet. After various quarrels between them and misbehavior of Surya, his grandfather narrates Surya his reason behind making him a police officer. During Surya's childhood, his father Jagadeswara Rao (Charanraj) killed his mother to marry C.M. Ekambareswara Rao's (Gokina Rama Rao) sister and framed his own father for it. Once this is revealed, Surya decides to take revenge, completes his training and becomes a police officer. Meanwhile, Rajeswara Rao (Charuhasan), Sirisha's father contests election against C.M. Jagadeswara Rao. He murders Rajeswara Rao & his entire family and Surya takes up the case, but Jagadeswara Rao and C.M.'s tactics make Surya land in jail, which forms the rest of story.

Cast

 Venkatesh as Surya
 Vijayshanti as Sirisha
 Satyanayana as Surya's grandfather
 Nutan Prasad as Ranganayakulu
 Sarath Kumar as Pruthvi Raj
 Charanraj as Jagadeswara Rao
 Charuhasan as Rajeswara Rao
 Rallapalli as P.A.
 Vallabhaneni Janardhan as Jailor
 Gokina Rama Rao as C.M. Eekambraswara Rao
 Kota Shankar Rao as Commissioner
 Narayana Rao as Sirisha's brother-in-law
 Bhimeswara Rao as Judge
 Jyothi as Parvathi
 Sudha Rani as Savitri
 Tatineni Rajeswari as P.A's wife
 Tarun as Surya's step brother

Soundtrack

Music composed by Ilaiyaraaja. Music released on LEO Audio company.

References

External links
 

1991 films
1990s Telugu-language films
Films directed by A. Kodandarami Reddy
Films scored by Ilaiyaraaja
Indian drama films
1991 drama films